Cleveland is a city in northeast Ohio, United States.

Cleveland may also refer to:

Places

Australia 
 Cleveland, Queensland
 Electoral district of Cleveland
 Cleveland, Tasmania, a place along the Midland Highway

Canada 
 Cleveland, Nova Scotia
 Cleveland, Quebec

Germany 
 An obsolete English term for the Duchy of Cleves

South Africa 
 Cleveland, Gauteng

United Kingdom 
 Cleveland, Yorkshire, an area in the north of England
 Cleveland Hills, a range of hills in north eastern Yorkshire
 Cleveland (county), former county in the North East of England region
 Cleveland (UK Parliament constituency) (1885–1974)
 Cleveland (European Parliament constituency) (1979–1984)
 Archdeaconry of Cleveland

United States 
 Cleveland, Alabama, a town
 Cleveland, Arkansas
 Cleveland, Florida, a census-designated place
 Cleveland, Georgia, a city
 Cleveland, Illinois
 Cleveland, Indiana
 Cleveland, Kansas
 Cleveland, Minnesota, a city
 Cleveland, Minneapolis, Minnesota, a neighborhood
 Cleveland, Mississippi, a city
 Cleveland, Missouri, a city
 Cleveland, New York
 Cleveland, North Carolina, a town
 Cleveland, Johnston County, North Carolina
 Cleveland, North Dakota
 Cleveland, Oklahoma, a city
 Cleveland, South Carolina
 Cleveland, Tennessee
 Cleveland, Texas
 Cleveland, Utah, a town
 Cleveland, Virginia, a town
 Cleveland, Washington, an unincorporated community
 Cleveland, Wisconsin (disambiguation)
 Cleveland County, Arkansas
 Cleveland County, North Carolina
 Cleveland County, Oklahoma
 Cleveland National Forest, California
 Mount Cleveland (Alaska), a summit of Chuginadak Island
 Mount Cleveland (Montana), the highest summit of Glacier National Park

Ships 
 , various United States Navy ships
 Cleveland-class cruiser, a World War II United States Navy class of light cruiser
 Cleveland-class amphibious transport dock, a United States Navy class
 , a Second World War Royal Navy destroyer
 HMY Cleveland (1671), a 17th century royal yacht of the Kingdom of England - see List of royal yachts of the United Kingdom
 , a steam-powered passenger ship operated by the Hamburg America Line

Companies 
 Cleveland Bridge & Engineering Company, major structural engineering company in the United Kingdom
 Cleveland Golf, a U.S. golf equipment brand
 Cleveland Motor Car Company, a U.S. company that manufactured automobiles in the 1900s
 Cleveland motorcycle (disambiguation), several different brands of motorcycles
 Cleveland Tractor Company, manufacturer of crawler tractors from 1916 to 1945
 Cleveland, a former petrol company acquired by Esso
 Cleveland Automobile Company, an automobile manufacturer that merged with Chandler Motor Car in 1926

Transportation
 Cleveland Street, Sydney, New South Wales, Australia
 Cleveland Street, London, England
 Cleveland Street, a historic main street in Clearwater, Florida, United States
 Cleveland railway station, Queensland, Australia
 Cleveland railway station (1897–1960), a former station in Queensland

People
 Cleveland (surname)
 Cleveland (given name)
 Cleveland (Hasidic dynasty), a pair of Hasidic Jewish dynasties

Fictional characters 
 Cleveland Brown, on Family Guy and The Cleveland Show
 Cleveland Brown, Jr., his son
 Cleveland, from the mobile game Azur Lane

Other uses
 List of Cleveland sports teams
 Cleveland High School (disambiguation)
 Duke of Cleveland, two extinct titles, one in the Peerage of England and one in the Peerage of the United Kingdom
 Earl of Cleveland, a title held only by Thomas Wentworth, 1st Earl of Cleveland (1591–1667) before becoming extinct
 "Cleveland" (30 Rock), an episode of 30 Rock
 Cleveland (album), an album by Layzie Bone
 Ford 335 engine or Cleveland V8

See also
 
 Cleveland Township (disambiguation)
 Mount Cleveland (disambiguation)
 Cape Cleveland (disambiguation)
 Cleaveland (disambiguation)